Allen Joe Fish (born November 12, 1942) is a senior United States district judge of the United States District Court for the Northern District of Texas in Dallas, Texas.

Education and career

Born in Los Angeles, California, Fish received his Bachelor of Arts degree from Yale University in 1965 and his Bachelor of Laws from Yale Law School in 1968. He was a Sergeant in the United States Army Reserve from 1968 to 1974, and was in private practice in Dallas, Texas, from 1968 to 1980. In 1980 he was elected to the 95th Judicial District Court of Dallas County, Texas. From 1981 to 1983 he was a judge on the Fifth District of the Texas Court of Appeals in Dallas.

Federal judicial service

On January 31, 1983, Fish was nominated by President Ronald Reagan to a seat on the United States District Court for the Northern District of Texas vacated by Judge Patrick Higginbotham. Fish was confirmed by the United States Senate less than a month later, on February 23, 1983, and received his commission the following day. He served as Chief Judge of the district from 2002 to 2007, assuming senior status on November 12, 2007.

References

External links
 
 Dallas Bar Association profile

Living people
1942 births
Lawyers from Dallas
Lawyers from Los Angeles
Military personnel from Dallas
Bryan Adams High School alumni
Yale Law School alumni
Judges of the United States District Court for the Northern District of Texas
United States district court judges appointed by Ronald Reagan
20th-century American judges
United States Army soldiers
21st-century American judges